Valicheru is a village in Atreyapuram Mandal, East Godavari district in the state of Andhra Pradesh in India.

Geography 

Demographics 
 India census, Valicheru had a population of 4627, out of which 2378 were male and 2249 were female. The population of children below 6 years of age was 10%. The literacy rate of the village was 65%.

References 

Villages in Atreyapuram mandal